Kunzel is a surname. Notable people with the surname include:

Erich Kunzel (1935–2009), American orchestra conductor
Fred Kunzel (1901–1969), United States federal judge
Ingrid Künzel (born 1938), German swimmer
Michael Künzel (born 1973), German speed skater
Tobias Künzel (born 1964), German pop artist and composer